Martín Perfecto de Cos (1800–1 October 1854) was a Mexican Army general and politician during the mid-19th century. Born in Veracruz, the son of an attorney, he became an army cadet at the age of 20, a lieutenant in 1821, and a brigadier general in 1833.

Cos is perhaps best known as a commander of Mexican forces during the Texas Revolution in the 1830s. In September 1835, he was sent by President-General Antonio López de Santa Anna to investigate the refusal of Texians to pay duties during the Anahuac Disturbances. General Cos dispersed the legislature of Coahuila y Tejas, then in session at Monclova, landed 300 men at Matagorda Bay, established a headquarters in San Antonio, and declared his intention of ending Anglo-American resistance in Texas. He attempted to arrest several Texian critics of Santa Anna, but his demands were resisted; a force of Texians under Stephen F. Austin and Edward Burleson held the Mexican troops for two months in the siege of Béxar until Cos surrendered after an attack led by Benjamin R. Milam in December 1835. Cos and his men were released on their pledge not to oppose further the Constitution of 1824, which Santa Anna had recently repealed.

Texians believed this pledge was broken when Cos returned in the spring of 1836 to command a column in the attack on the Alamo. On April 21, 1836, he reached San Jacinto with reinforcements and crossed Vince's Bridge just before the Texians destroyed it. He was taken prisoner by Sam Houston in the general surrender and later released, after which he returned to Mexico. Cos later commanded a post at Tuxpan during the Mexican–American War. He died in Minatitlán, Veracruz, in 1854, while serving as commandant general and political chief of the Tehuantepec territory.

Family

It is generally accepted that Martín Perfecto de Cos was a relative of Antonio López de Santa Anna, and most accounts refer to him as a brother-in-law. The Encyclopedia of the Mexican American War states that he was married to Lucinda López de Santa Anna, the general's sister. Some early Texas accounts also credit him as being either an cousin or nephew of Santa Anna.

Military career

When the Mexican government moved away from a new local-level federalist political ideology to create a centralist authoritarian government under Santa Anna, Martín Perfecto de Cos became military commander of the Mexican state of Coahuila y Tejas in 1833. He initially was headquartered in Saltillo. San Antonio had always governed its own affairs and its citizens, increasingly ethnic Anglo-Americans with closer ties to the emerging United States, resented Cos being given power over them. As tensions between Mexico City and Mexican Texas increased, Cos headed north to put down the rebellion. 

Cos arrived in Texas by sea at the port of Copano on September 20, 1835 with 500 soldiers and proceeded to the town of Goliad on October 1, where he ordered the arrest of rebel leaders and garrisoned his men inside the nearby Presidio La Bahía. Even before his arrival, a group of Texians had plotted to kidnap Cos at either Copano or Goliad, but a rebellion committee rejected the idea. The Texas Revolution began in earnest with the Battle of Gonzales on October 2, and upon learning of the Texian victory, Cos hurried to San Antonio de Béxar, leaving with the bulk of his men on October 5. Texians assaulted the Presidio La Bahía at the Battle of Goliad on October 10, only to learn that Cos had already left.

Once he was in San Antonio, the town and Cos' men were besieged by the Texian Army under the leadership of Stephen F. Austin. After a 56-day siege of the town and the Alamo Mission, on December 9, Cos surrendered San Antonio de Béxar and its weapons to the Texians, then proceeded to retreat back across the Rio Grande. Cos and his men were allowed to keep their muskets for protection, as well as one four-pound cannon. Mexican losses during the siege were about 150. On his way south, Cos met up with Santa Anna's forces at Laredo, who were marching north to put down the rebellion.

In February 1836, Cos returned to San Antonio with Santa Anna and led a column of 300 soldiers in the siege of the Alamo. His men assaulted the northwest corner of the mission on March 6, eventually overrunning the north wall. On April 21, Cos arrived with over 500 reinforcements for Santa Anna shortly before the Battle of San Jacinto. That afternoon Texian forces led by General Sam Houston decisively defeated Santa Anna's army in a battle which lasted only eighteen minutes. Cos and Santa Anna both escaped during the battle; Santa Anna was captured the next day, on April 22, and Cos was captured on April 24. General Santa Anna subsequently surrendered his army and eventually all Mexican claims to Texas, ending the Texas Revolution.

Mexican–American War

Following the Texas Revolution, Martín Perfecto de Cos remained in the Mexican Army and was given command of an army outpost in Tuxpan, where he served during the Mexican–American War and afterwards, until his death in 1854.

Film depictions

Among the depictions of Martín Perfecto de Cos on film is that of the Mexico City-born actor Rodolfo Hoyos Jr., in the 1956 picture The First Texan, about the rise of Sam Houston in Texas. In the film, Cos orders the arrest of William B. Travis and directs his Mexican soldiers to scale the walls of The Alamo.

In the 2004 film The Alamo, General Martín Perfecto de Cos is portrayed by Francisco Philibert.

References

Bibliography

1800 births
1854 deaths
People of Spanish Texas
Mexican generals
People of Mexican side in the Texas Revolution
Mexican military personnel of the Mexican–American War
Colonial United States (Mexican)
Military personnel from Veracruz